"Close" is a song recorded by American singer Nick Jonas from his third studio album, Last Year Was Complicated. The track features guest vocals from Swedish singer Tove Lo. It was released on March 25, 2016, by Island, Safehouse and Republic Records as the album's lead single. The song was written by Tove Lo, Julia Michaels, Justin Tranter, and its producers Mattias "Mattman" Larsson and Robin Fredriksson.

Background
During a Twitter session, Jonas explained that the track is "about how I literally can't open up and be vulnerable with someone".
The melody of the song was released over the days before the release of the song, through several tweets.

Composition
The song is written in the key of A major with a tempo of 120 beats per minute.

Critical reception
James Grebey of Spin magazine called "Close" a "sultry" track and deeply personal.
Brittany Spanos of Rolling Stone called the song a sexy, steel-drum assisted single. Stephen Erlewine  of AllMusic wrote a positive review saying "'Close,' a duet with Tove Lo, is perhaps the best showcase for this aspect of Nick Jonas, but the entirety of Last Year Was Complicated walks a fine line between immaculately produced pop confection and personal confession."

Live performance
Jonas performed the song live with Tove Lo on Saturday Night Live on April 16, 2016. On April 24, 2016, he performed the song during his 75-minute set at the New Orleans Jazz Fest. He performed the song with Thomas Rhett and Daniella Bradbery for an episode of CMT Crossroads. On April 28, Jonas and Tove Lo performed the song on Jimmy Kimmel Live!. Jonas performed the song solo on The Ellen DeGeneres Show on May 9, 2016. He and Tove Lo performed "Close" live on May 22, 2016, at the 2016 Billboard Music Awards. On June 10, he performed the song live on Today.
Jonas performed the song as a part of his setlist for the Future Now Tour with Demi Lovato singing Lo's lyrics. Jonas also performed the song live on German TV show Germany's Next Topmodel.

Music video
The music video was released the same day as the single and was directed by Tim Erem. The video depicts both singers unable to physically touch each other as they are continuously pulled away from the other. As their clothes are ripped away, the pair is able to finally get close. The more vulnerable the pair get, the closer they are able to get.

Track listing
Digital download remixes
"Close"  – 3:28
"Close"  – 3:44

Credits and personnel
Nick Jonas – lead vocals
Tove Lo – songwriting, featured vocals 
Robin Fredriksson – writing, production
Mattias Larsson – writing, production
Julia Michaels – writing
Justin Tranter – writing

Charts

Weekly charts

Year-end charts

Certifications

Release history

References 

2016 singles
2016 songs
Nick Jonas songs
Tove Lo songs
Safehouse Records singles
Song recordings produced by Mattman & Robin
Songs written by Justin Tranter
Songs written by Tove Lo
Songs written by Julia Michaels
Songs written by Robin Fredriksson
Songs written by Mattias Larsson
Torch songs
Male–female vocal duets